In enzymology, a malate dehydrogenase (oxaloacetate-decarboxylating) is an enzyme that catalyzes the chemical reaction below

(S)-malate + NAD+  pyruvate + CO2 + NADH

Thus, the two substrates of this enzyme are (S)-malate and NAD+, whereas its 3 products are pyruvate, CO2, and NADH.

This enzyme belongs to the family of oxidoreductases, specifically those acting on the CH-OH group of donor with NAD+ or NADP+ as acceptor. The systematic name of this enzyme class is (S)-malate:NAD+ oxidoreductase (oxaloacetate-decarboxylating). Other names in common use include malic enzyme, pyruvic-malic carboxylase, NAD+-specific malic enzyme, NAD+-malic enzyme, and NAD+-linked malic enzyme. This enzyme participates in pyruvate metabolism.

Structural studies

See also
 ME2 (gene)

References

 

EC 1.1.1
NADH-dependent enzymes
Enzymes of known structure